Løvland is a Norwegian surname. Notable people with the name include:

Helge Løvland  (1890–1984), Norwegian track athlete
Jørgen Løvland (1848–1922), Norwegian politician and Prime Minister
Rolf Løvland (born 1955), Norwegian composer

See also
 Loveland (disambiguation)

Norwegian-language surnames